Crystal Springs Rhododendron Garden is a botanical garden located between Reed College and the Eastmoreland Golf Course in southeastern Portland in the U.S. state of Oregon.

Description and history
Crystal Springs Garden features more than 2,500 rhododendrons, azaleas, and other plants in a setting of small lakes, paved and unpaved paths, fountain, and small waterfalls.

The garden is open 10:00am to 4:00pm Thursday through Tuesday, and 1:00pm to 4:00pm on Wednesdays (last admission is at 3:30pm). Pets are allowed on a leash.

The project began in 1950 as a rhododendron test garden on a site previously covered with brush, blackberries, native trees, and the remnants of a Shakespeare theater developed by students of Reed College. In 1964, the park's name was officially changed to Crystal Springs Rhododendron Garden.

In addition to the manicured areas that make up most of the garden, patches of less orderly shrubs, upland forest, marsh vegetation, and submerged logs attract wildlife, especially waterfowl, most prevalent in winter. The Rhododendron Society has counted 94 species in the garden, including grebes, herons, ducks, Canada geese, wigeons, gulls, thrushes, nuthatches, hummingbirds, and others.

See also
 List of botanical gardens in the United States

References

External links

 Rhododendron Gardens brochure (archived)

1950 establishments in Oregon
Botanical gardens in Portland, Oregon
Eastmoreland, Portland, Oregon
Parks in Portland, Oregon
Protected areas established in 1950